A statue of  is installed in Guadalajara, in the Mexican state of Jalisco. It is located at the University of Guadalajara as Díaz de León served as the first dean after its re-foundation in 1925.

The statue was moved and placed in front of the General Rectory Building on 10 December 2015, where he looks at the avenue that bears his name.

References

External links

 

Monuments and memorials in Jalisco
Outdoor sculptures in Guadalajara
Sculptures of men in Mexico
Statues in Jalisco
University of Guadalajara